Thomas Coleman (1598–1647) was an English clergyman and scholar.

Thomas Coleman may also refer to:
Thomas Coleman (New York politician) (1808–1894), New York politician
Thomas E. Coleman (1893–1964), Wisconsin politician
Thomas B. Coleman (1795–1848), American mayor of Nashville, Tennessee
Thomas Coleman, better known as Tommy Shades or Thomas Hart, Australian DJ and electronic music producer
Thomas F. Coleman, professor of computer science and mathematics

See also  
Tom Coleman (disambiguation)